Reynoldstown Historic District, also known as Cameron Park, is a national historic district located at Winston-Salem, Forsyth County, North Carolina.  The district encompasses 183 contributing buildings and 1 contributing structure (Cameron Avenue Bridge) in a planned residential development of the R. J. Reynolds Tobacco Company (RJR) and historically African-American residential section of Winston-Salem.  The buildings date from about 1919 to 1949, and include notable examples of Colonial Revival, Tudor Revival, and Bungalow / American Craftsman style architecture.

It was listed on the National Register of Historic Places in 2008.

References

African-American history in Winston-Salem, North Carolina
Houses on the National Register of Historic Places in North Carolina
Historic districts on the National Register of Historic Places in North Carolina
Colonial Revival architecture in North Carolina
Tudor Revival architecture in North Carolina
Houses in Winston-Salem, North Carolina
National Register of Historic Places in Winston-Salem, North Carolina